Oscar Moreno was an Argentine rower. He competed in the men's coxless pair event at the 1948 Summer Olympics.

References

Year of birth missing
Year of death missing
Argentine male rowers
Olympic rowers of Argentina
Rowers at the 1948 Summer Olympics
Place of birth missing
Pan American Games medalists in rowing
Pan American Games gold medalists for Argentina
Rowers at the 1951 Pan American Games